Tingley Memorial Hall is a historic academic building located on the campus of Claflin University at Orangeburg, Orangeburg County, South Carolina. It was built in 1908, and is a two-story, brick Classical Revival style building. The buildings serves as the main building on the Claflin College campus. The hipped and gable roof is topped by an octagonal cupola.

It was added to the National Register of Historic Places in 1983. It is located in the Claflin College Historic District.

References 

African-American history of South Carolina
University and college buildings on the National Register of Historic Places in South Carolina
Neoclassical architecture in South Carolina
School buildings completed in 1908
Buildings and structures in Orangeburg County, South Carolina
National Register of Historic Places in Orangeburg County, South Carolina
Historic district contributing properties in South Carolina
1908 establishments in South Carolina